The 1902 Arizona football team was an American football team that represented the University of Arizona as an independent during the 1902 college football season. In its first and only season under head coach Leslie Gillett, the team compiled a 5–0 record, did not allow a point to be scored against it, and outscored opponents by a total of 134 to 0. In the second meeting in the Arizona–Arizona State football rivalry, Arizona defeated the Tempe Normal School, 12 to 0.  The team captain was Bard L. Cosgrove.

Schedule

References

Arizona
Arizona Wildcats football seasons
College football undefeated seasons
Arizona football